Ribun is a Dayak language of Borneo.

References

Languages of Indonesia
Land Dayak languages